There are numerous parks in the city of Los Angeles, California

This list does not include parks in the enclaves of 
city of Beverly Hills
city of Culver City
Ladera Heights (unincorporated Los Angeles County)
Marina del Ray (unincorporated Los Angeles County)
city of Santa Monica
city of West Hollywood

Parks having coordinates below may be seen together in a map by clicking on "Map of all coordinates using OpenStreetMap" at the right side of this page.

State parks in Los Angeles
State of California parks that are wholly or partly in the City of Los Angeles include:

Municipal parks of the city of Los Angeles
Municipal parks come under the administration of the City of Los Angeles Department of Recreation and Parks.  The overseeing body is the Department of Recreation and Park Board of Commissioners.  The first parks date back to 1889 under the City's first Freeholder Charter.

Notes

See also 

List of parks in Los Angeles County, California

References

Los Angeles parks
Los Angeles
Parks
Los Angeles, list